This is a list of the sheriffs and high sheriffs of Staffordshire.

The sheriff is the oldest secular office under the Crown. The sheriff was the principal law enforcement officer in the county but over the centuries most of the responsibilities associated with the post have been transferred elsewhere or are now defunct so that its functions are now largely ceremonial. From 1204 to 1344 the High Sheriff of Staffordshire also served as Sheriff of Shropshire.

Under the provisions of the Local Government Act 1972, on 1 April 1974 the office previously known as sheriff was retitled high sheriff. The high sheriff changes every March.

Sheriffs

11th century
 1086: Robert de Stafford 
 1094: Nicholas de Stafford

12th century

13th century

14th century

15th century

16th century

17th century

18th century

19th century

20th century

High sheriffs

20th century

21st century

References

 London Gazette

 
  History of Staffordshire from British History Online

volume 2 (1835)
volume 3 (1835)
volume 4 (1835)

 
Staffordshire
Local government in Staffordshire
History of Staffordshire
Staffordshire-related lists